Vaccinium oxycoccos is a species of flowering plant in the heath family. It is known as small cranberry, marshberry, bog cranberry, swamp cranberry, or, particularly in Britain, just cranberry. It is widespread throughout the cool temperate northern hemisphere, including northern Europe, northern Asia and northern North America.

Description
This cranberry is a small, prostrate shrub with vine-like stems that root at the nodes. Flowers arise on nodding stalks a few centimeters tall. The corolla is white or pink and flexed backward away from the center of the flower. The fruit is a red berry which has spots when young. The plant forms associations with mycorrhizae. It mainly reproduces vegetatively.

Distribution and habitat
Vaccinium oxycoccos is a widespread and common species occurring broadly across cooler climates in the temperate northern hemisphere. It is an indicator of moist to wet soils which are low in nitrogen and have a high water table. It is an indicator of coniferous swamps. It grows in bogs and fens in moist forest habitat. It grows on peat which may be saturated most of the time. The soil in bogs is acidic and low in nutrients. The plant's mycorrhizae help it obtain nutrients in this situation. Fens have somewhat less acidic soil, which is also higher in nutrients. The plant can often be found growing on hummocks of Sphagnum mosses.

Ecology
In North America, other species found in this forest understory habitat include leatherleaf (Chamaedaphne calyculata), bog rosemary (Andromeda glaucophylla), bog laurel (Kalmia polifolia), pitcher plant (Sarracenia purpurea), Labrador tea (Rhododendron groenlandicum), cloudberry (Rubus chamaemorus), rhodora (Rhododendron canadense), glossy buckthorn (Rhamnus frangula), sundew (Drosera spp.), cottonsedge (Eriophorum virginatum and E. angustifolium), and species of sedge and lichen. The plant easily colonizes bog habitat that has recently burned. It survives fire with its underground rhizomes.

Uses
The berries of Vaccinium oxycoccos are edible and have been used both as a medicine and as a food by various Native American communities. Some Iñupiat cook the cranberry with fish eggs and blubber.

References

External links

 Washington Burke Museum, University of Washington
 illustration from Flora of China Illustrations vol. 14, fig. 688, 2-5 
 
 
 Luontoportti, NatureGate, Isokarpalo (Vaccinium oxycoccos) description, photos, ecological and culinary information, link to distribution map for Finland
 
 Ontario Wildflowers

oxycoccos
Flora of Northern Europe
Flora of temperate Asia
Flora of Subarctic America
Flora of Canada
Flora of the Northeastern United States
Flora of the Northwestern United States
Flora of Alaska
Flora of the Appalachian Mountains
Flora of the Great Lakes region (North America)
Plants described in 1753
Taxa named by Carl Linnaeus
Edible plants
Inuit cuisine
oxycoccos